Andrzej Kowalski (1930 in Sosnowiec – 2004) was a Polish painter and graphics artist. From 1949 to 1955, he attended the Cracow Academy of Fine Arts. He became director of the studio of painting and drawing at the Academy of Fine Arts in Katowice.

References

External links
 Akademia Sztuk Pięknych w Katowicach

1930 births
2004 deaths
20th-century Polish painters
20th-century Polish male artists
21st-century Polish painters
21st-century male artists
People from Sosnowiec
Polish male painters